Saquri (also Romanized as S̄aqūrī and S̄aghūrī) is a village in Nimbeluk Rural District, Nimbeluk District, Qaen County, South Khorasan Province, Iran. At the 2006 census, its population was 83, in 23 families.

References 

Populated places in Qaen County